Hapur Junction railway station is the main railway station serving Hapur city in the Hapur district, Uttar Pradesh. Its code is HPU. The station consists of five platforms. Hapur is a major railway junction of northern India. Two lines – Delhi–Moradabad and Meerut–Bulandshahr–Khurja – pass through the city.

Trains for New Delhi are available most of the time, thus making it easy for service people to travel. Trains are available for cities such as Lucknow, Guwahati, Ahmedabad, Ludhiana, Amritsar, Jalandhar, Varanasi, Dehradun, Gorakhpur, Jammu, etc.

Routes
The following proposed NCR's Regional Orbital Rail Corridor (RORC) will pass through here:
 Panipat–Rohtak line, via Panipat–Gohana–Rohtak, existing. 
 Rewari–Rohtak line, via Rohtak–Jhajjar–Rewari, existing. 
 Rewari–Khurja line, via Rewari–Palwal–Bhiwadi–Khurja, new rail line, survey completed.
 Khurja–Meerut line, via Khurja–Bulandshahr–Hapur–Meerut, existing.  
 Meerut–Panipat line, new rail line, survey completed.

Gallery

References

External links

Railway junction stations in Uttar Pradesh
Railway stations in Hapur district
Moradabad railway division
Hapur